Riot Live may refer to:

 Riot Live (EP), an EP by Riot
 Riot Live (album), an album by Riot